International Teaching University of Georgia (formerly  Tbilisi Teaching University Gorgasali) is a multidisciplinary University in Georgia. International Teaching University of Georgia is the new name of the institution as of 2016. From 2017 on, the University will have its new name fully implemented. Its present name of Tbilisi Teaching University Gorgasali will then disappear.

History 
The Tbilisi Teaching University Gorgasali was founded in Tbilisi, Georgia, in 1995. It is a private company owned by Mzia Katamadze. From its very first beginning, Gorgasali University consequentially developed a high-profile through superior academic standards. Its renowned Law School, one of the country’s best Business Schools, but also its medical studies have resulted in high reputation in Georgia and beyond.

The University resides in one of the most prestigious parts of Georgia’s capital Tbilisi. The campus offers modern classrooms, an extensive library, sports and leisure facilities, but also a state of the art Dental Clinic and an affiliated University Hospital.

In 2015, preparations started for significant changes. Their result is a new structure in which, the owner and Rector of Gorgasali University, Prof Dr Mzia Katamadze, was appointed President in early 2016. With reference to its permanently increasing global position the Tbilisi Teaching University Gorgasali is in the process of changing its name to International (Teaching) University of Georgia. The old name of Gorgasali University will gradually be replaced until 2017.

Degree Awarding Powers 

In accordance with the requirements resulted from the reforms in the educational system, the University successfully has passed all stages of official authorisation and accreditation processes in 2002, 2007, and 2012.

Gorgasali University has received cognate Degree Awarding Powers from the Ministry of Education and Science of Georgia.

International Degree Recognition 
Georgia is aligned with the European Process of Harmonisation of Higher Education in Europe, also known as Bologna Process, making Degrees of the Gorgasali University cognate across Europe.

In particular, NARIC UK has confirmed Gorgasali University Degrees’ equivalence with degrees of British universities. Similar, the German Ständige Konferenz der Kultusminister (KMK) has officially recognised the University’s degrees and placed Gorgasali University on its Anabin list of recognised foreign universities.

Accreditations and memberships 
University Gorgasali is accredited by the National Center for Educational Quality Enhancement, NCEQE(ENQA), which conducts recognition of educational institutions based on Georgian legislation authorised by the Minister of Education and Science of Georgia.

The University also is Member of the European Union’s Erasmus Tempus programme. Erasmus has specifically selected the University’s Master in Hospitality Management and awarded the prize of Best Programme.

Gorgasali University has introduced MBA programmes to the Georgian Higher Education system. Before the Ministry of Education and Science accredited the Gorgasali MBA as the first of its kind, the MBA did not exist as academic Degree in Georgia.

Programmes of Studies 
Gorgasali University offers studies on

·       Bachelor Level

·       Master’s Level

All studies are focused on delivering Employability Impact. For both academic/scientific or professional careers curricula are carefully designed to equip students with a relevant and applicable set of skills and capabilities. Beyond concentrated subject orientation all programmes of studies are subject to added value through significant components of leadership qualities, corporate and/or social responsibility. The research orientation of the University assures that latest knowledge is delivered to students through research-based content and short-term periods between actualisation of content for each programme of studies.

Single Programmes of Studies 

Gorgasali University delivers its programmes of studies in a wide variety of subject areas. The University therefore is structured into Schools, Institutes, Departments, and Faculties:
 The Law School – LLB and LLM
 The Business and Management School – Bachelor / BBA, Master / MBA
 The Language Institute
 The Faculty of Literature
 The Department of Pharmacy and Stomatology Studies
 The University’s Dental Clinic
 The affiliated University Hospital

References 

Universities in Georgia (country)